“Nicaragua” or “La patriótica” was the first national anthem of Nicaragua, premiered during a tertulia in Masaya in 1876 and adopted by the government of Pedro Joaquín Chamorro Alfaro in the same year. It was composed by José del Carmen Vega, with lyrics written by Fernando Álvarez. It was used until 1889, when it was replaced by Marcha Roberto Sacasa.

During the early years of José Santos Zelaya’s administration, readoption of the music of this anthem was taken into consideration, but ultimately a different anthem, Hermosa Soberana, has been adopted.

Lyrics

References

External links
 

National anthems
Historical national anthems
National symbols of Nicaragua
Spanish-language songs
Nicaraguan songs
North American anthems
National anthem compositions in F major